Rekrut (en: recruit, fr:recrue, it:recluta) is the designation of a military appointment, position or status in German-speaking countries and in the 18th and 19th century Russian Empire (see Conscription in the Russian Empire) that characterizes newly recruited or sought personnel during the initial period of the basic military training. However, in some countries, e.g. Austria and Switzerland, Rekrut might be the lowest rank of enlisted men, comparable to NATO OR-1.

Historical roots
The French recroître, on the other hand, is derived from the Latin recrescere (regrow, grow again, or back). The noun was acclimatized to German language in the 17th century.

Germany
In the German Bundeswehr Rekrut is the generic term for a military person (de: Soldat, or Soldatin) during the basic training. In most cases it may refer to the lowest rank of enlisted men e.g. Soldat of the German Army, Flieger of the German Air Force, or Matrose of the German Navy. 
See also:

Austria

In the Austrian Bundesheer Rekrut (until 1998 Wehrmann, en: soldier) is the lowest rank in Heer and Luftwaffe. It belongs to the so-called Rekruten rank group (en: recruits rank group / enlisted men) and is comparable to OR-1 in NATO.

During United Nations missions and in NATO's Partnership for Peace the rank Rekrut is designated in English with Private (rank) (Prv) and is equivalent to NATO-Rank code OR-1b.

 See also
⇒ Ranks of the Austrian Bundesheer

Military of Switzerland 

In the Swiss Armed Forces Rekrut (short: Rek) is the lowest rank in Heer and Luftwaffe comparable to NATO OR-1b. However, it is also the generic term for newly recruited military personnel during basic training.

 See also
⇒ Military ranks of the Swiss Armed Forces

References 

 BROCKHAUS, The encyclopedia in 24 volumes (1796–2001), Volume 18: 3-7653-3678-5, page 231; definition «Rerkrut».

Military insignia
Military ranks of Austria
Military ranks of Germany
Military ranks of Switzerland